Thomas Gothard Selby (19 February 1851 – 6 November 1924) was an English cricketer who played for Derbyshire in 1885.

Selby was born in North Wingfield, Derbyshire. He played his only game for Derbyshire in the 1885 season against Marylebone Cricket Club (MCC) at Lord's in June. In the match, he scored 1 and 2 and bowled 4 overs for the loss of 7 runs. Most of the Derbyshire bowling was delivered by Shacklock and Mycroft. With the captain Ludford Docker absent hurt from the second innings,  Derbyshire lost the match by an innings margin. Selby was a right-handed batsman and played 2 innings in one first-class match. He was a right-arm fast bowler but took no wickets in his four overs.

Selby died in Shirebrook, Derbyshire at the age of 73.

References

1851 births
1924 deaths
English cricketers
Derbyshire cricketers
People from North Wingfield
Cricketers from Derbyshire